Novoalexandrovsky District is an administrative district (raion), one of the twenty-six in Stavropol Krai, Russia. Municipally, it is incorporated as Novoalexandrovsky Municipal District. It is located in the west of the krai. Its administrative center is the town of Novoalexandrovsk. Population:  67,065 (2002 Census); 58,630 (1989 Census). The population of Novoalexandrovsk accounts for 40.9% of the district's total population.

References

Notes

Sources

Districts of Stavropol Krai